Robert K. Irving is a Canadian industrialist based in Moncton, New Brunswick.
A grandson of Kenneth Colin Irving and son of James K. Irving and Jean E. Irving, Robert is responsible for several businesses within the "Irving Group of Companies" with operations extending across North America.

Career
Robert Irving is co-CEO of J.D. Irving Limited. He also served as the president of Irving Tissue, operated in coordination with its supplier, J.D. Irving Limited, which has the Majesta and Royale brands and Irving Personal Care.

He is president of Cavendish Farms, which has french fry and frozen food plants in North Dakota, Lethbridge, Alberta, Wheatley, Ontario and Prince Edward Island
He is co-chief executive officer of Midland Transport,
and president of Midland Courier, both of which are shipping companies.
He is president of the Moncton Wildcats, a QMJHL franchise.
Other businesses Robert Irving is responsible for include: Cavendish Produce (which provides fresh produce for the retail and restaurant sector), Cavendish Agri (a supplier of agricultural fertilizers, chemicals and agricultural solutions) and Protrans (a supplier of contract services, labor and professional expertise).
Both Robert and his brother, Jim Irving, are co-CEO of J.D. Irving Ltd., which is based out of Saint John, New Brunswick.

References

Acadia University alumni
Businesspeople from New Brunswick
People from Moncton
Living people
Year of birth missing (living people)